The Malawi Stock Exchange (the MSE) is a stock market, with a single licensed broker is based in Blantyre, Malawi.

Overview 
The Malawi Stock Exchange was inaugurated in March 1995 and opened for business for the first time on 11 November 1996, under the aegis of the Reserve Bank of Malawi, with 2,300 Malawian citizens buying shares in the first company to be listed – Malawi's largest insurance firm, the National Insurance Company. 

International Finance Corporation, a World Bank affiliate, and the Financierings Maatschappij Ontwikkelingslanden, a Dutch development bank with close ties to the Dutch Ministry for Development Co-operation, provided 40% of the $500,000 required for establishing the stock market in Blantyre, and the European Union sponsored seminars and publicity campaigns. The exchange operates in terms of the Capital Markets Development Act of 1990 and the Capital Market Development Regulations of 1992. It has a supervisory committee which comprises representatives of the central bank, the government and the private sector. It is a member of the African Stock Exchanges Association.

The MSE has a modest market listing. More stringent listing rules are currently being prepared. Membership of the Exchange is corporate and individual.

Market listing

See also
 Economy of Malawi
 List of stock exchanges
 List of African stock exchanges

External links
 Website of Malawi Stock Exchange

References

1995 establishments in Malawi
Companies listed on Malawi Stock Exchange
Stock exchanges in Africa
Economy of Malawi
Companies of Malawi
Blantyre